Soleyman Bolaghi (also Romanized as Soleymān Bolāghī; also known as Soleymān Bolāgh, Soleymānbūlāghī, Sulaimanbulāqi, and Suleyman-Bulag) is a village in Qareh Poshtelu-e Pain Rural District, Qareh Poshtelu District, Zanjan County, Zanjan Province, Iran. At the 2006 census, its population was 40, in 9 families.

References 

Populated places in Zanjan County